Lee (리 or 이) is a family name among ethnic Koreans, with approximately 15% of all Koreans sharing the name. This is a list of notable people with the Korean name Lee, also transliterated as Yi, in South Korea and Ri, in North Korea; Yie, Rhee and Rhie are also other variations.

Notable people with the surname

General
Lee Choon-jae, South Korean serial killer
Yi Cheong, Korean-Japanese noble, member of the former Imperial Family of Korea
Yi Gae, 15th century government official and scholar of the Joseon Dynasty
Yi Kang, Korean royalty
Yi Ku, Korean royalty
Lee Hae-chan, South Korean politician, 32nd Prime Minister of South Korea
Yi Hwang, 16th century Confucian scholar
Yi I, 16th century Confucian scholar
Yi Ik (born 1681), 18th century Neo Confucian scholar
Yi Jongmu, 15th century Korean general
Lee Kun-hee, South Korean business magnate, former chairman of Samsung Group
Lee Kyung-hae, South Korean farmer and political activist
Yi Eokgi, 16th century naval commander
Lee Sang-yun, South Korean professor
Lee Soo-man, South Korean businessman, founder of S.M. Entertainment
Yi So-yeon, South Korean astronaut and biotechnologist, first Korean to fly in space
Yi Sun-sin, 16th century admiral
Lee Tai-young, South Korea's first female lawyer, founder of the first South Korean legal aid centre
Ri Sol-ju, current First Lady of North Korea
Ri Chun-hee, North Korean news presenter
Ri In-mo, pro-North Korea activist imprisoned in South Korea 
Michelle Rhee, American educator
Simon Hang-bock Rhee, South Korean Scout

Politicians
Lee Beom-seok (prime minister), Korean independence activist and 1st Prime Minister of South Korea
Lee Beom-seok (foreign minister), South Korean diplomat, former Foreign Minister of South Korea and victim of the Rangoon bombing 
Lee Cheol-woo, South Korean politician, member of the National Assembly of South Korea
Lee Chul-woo, South Korean government official
Lee Eui-geun, South Korean politician
Lee Hoi-chang, South Korean politician and 26th Prime Minister of South Korea 
Lee Jong-wook, South Korean physician, director-general of the World Health Organization
Lee Myung-bak, South Korean businessman and politician, 10th President of South Korea
Regine Biscoe Lee, Guamanian politician
Lee Sang-don, South Korean legal scholar and conservative liberal political activist
Syngman Rhee, South Korean politician, 1st President of South Korea
Lee Wan-koo, 39th prime minister of South Korea

Arts

General
Cecilia Hae-Jin Lee, Korean-American writer, artist, photographer and chef
Edeline Lee, Canadian British fashion designer
Lee Chang-dong, South Korean film director, screenwriter, and novelist
EunWon Lee, South Korean ballet dancer
Lee Hyeonggi, South Korean modern poet
Yi In-seong, South Korean modern novelist
Sueyeun Juliette Lee, Korean American video artist and poet
Lee Kang-baek, South Korean playwright
Lee Ki-ho (writer), South Korean writer
Lee Mun-ku, South Korean novelist
Lee O-young, South Korean critic and novelist
Lee Pa-ni, South Korean model and actress
Lee Sa-bi, South Korean model and actress
Lee Saek, 14th century philosopher and poet
Yi Sang, 20th century writer
Soo Yeon Lee, South Korean table tennis player and model
Lee Sung-Hi, South Korean model and actress

Actors and actresses
Lee Beom-soo, South Korean actor
Lee Bo-young, South Korean actress
Lee Byung-hun, South Korean actor
Lee Chae-mi, South Korean child actress 
Lee Chae-young, South Korean actress
Lee Da-in (actress, born 1992), South Korean actress
Lee Da-hae, Korean-Australian actress
Lee Do-hyun (born Lim Dong-hyun), South Korean actor
Lee Dong-gun, South Korean actor and singer
Lee Dong-wook, South Korean actor and model
Lee El, South Korean actress
Lee Elijah, South Korean actress
Lee Eun-ju, South Korean actress
Lee Ha-yool, South Korean actor
Lee Hee-jin, South Korean actress and singer
Lee Hyun-wook, South Korean actor
Lee Ji-ah (born Kim Sang-eun), South Korean actress
Lee Jae-wook, South Korean actor and model
Lee Jin-wook, South Korean actor
Lee Joo-bin, South Korean actress and model
Lee Joo-woo, South Korean actress
Lee Jung-eun, South Korean actress
Lee Jung-hoon (stage same Yoon So-ho), South Korean theatre and musical actor
Lee Jung-jae, South Korean actor and filmmaker
Lee Je-hoon, South Korean actor
Lee Joon-gi, South Korean actor, singer, and model
Lee Jong-suk, South Korean actor and model
Lee Kang-min, South Korean actor
Ki Hong Lee, Korean-American actor
Lee Kwang-soo, South Korean actor and model
Lee Mi-yeon, South Korean actress
Lee Min-ho (born 1987), South Korean actor and model
Lee Min-jung, South Korean actress
Lee Min-ki, South Korean actor, singer and model
Lee Mi-sook, South Korean actress
Lee Min-woo, South Korean actor
Lee Na-young, South Korean actress
Lee Sang-hee, South Korean actress
Lee Sang-woo, South Korean actor
Lee Sang-yoon, South Korean actor
Lee Seul-bi, South Korean actress
Lee Si-woo, South Korean actress and model
Lee Si-yeon, South Korean actress
Lee Si-young, South Korean actress and former amateur boxer
Lee Soo-hyuk, South Korean actor and model
Lee Soo-kyung (actress, born 1982), South Korean actress
Lee Soo-kyung (actress, born 1996), South Korean actress
Lee Soon-jae, South Korean actor
Stephanie Lee, Korean-American actress and model
Lee Sung-kyung, South Korean actress and model
Lee Tae-gon, South Korean actor
Lee Tae-im, South Korean actress
Lee Tae-ran, South Korean actress
Lee Tae-ri, South Korean actor
Lee Tae-sun, South Korean actor
Lee Tae-sung, South Korean actor
Lee Yeon-hee, South Korean actress
Lee Yoo-mi, South Korean actress
Lee Yoon-ji, South Korean actress
Lee Young-ae, South Korean actress
Lee Yu-bi, South Korean actress
Lee Yu-ri, South Korean actress
Lee Hwi-jae, South Korean TV presenter, comedian, actor, and singer

Members of boy bands
Lee Byung-yoon (stage name Bewhy), South Korean rapper, member of hip hop band $exy $treet & Yello Music crew
Lee Chang-sub, South Korean singer, member of boy band BTOB
Lee Chang-sun (stage name Lee Joon), South Korean singer, member of boy band MBLAQ
Lee Dae-hwi, South Korean singer, member of boy band AB6IX
Lee Donghae, South Korean singer, member of boy band Super Junior
Lee Dong-min (stage name Cha Eunwoo), South Korean singer and actor, member of boy band Astro
Lee Eun-sang, South Korean singer, member of boy band Younite
Lee Gi-kwang, South Korean singer, member of boy band Highlight
Lee Hoe-taek (stage name Hui), South Korean singer, member of boy band Pentagon
Lee Hong-bin, South Korean singer, member of boy band VIXX
Lee Hong-gi, South Korean singer and actor, member of boy band FT Island
Lee Ho-won (stage name Hoya), South Korean actor, former member of boy band Infinite
Lee Ho-seok (stage name Wonho), South Korean singer, former member of boy band Monsta X
Lee Joo-heon, (stage name Joohoney), South Korean rapper, member of boy band Monsta X
Lee Hyuk-jae (stage name Eunhyuk), South Korean rapper, member of boy band Super Junior
Lee Jae-jin, member of South Korean boy band Sechs Kies
Lee Jae-won, South Korean singer, member of boy band H.O.T.
Lee Je-no, South Korean rapper, member of boy band NCT 
Lee Ji-hoon (stage name Woozi), South Korean singer, member of boy band Seventeen
Lee Jin-ki (stage name Onew), South Korean singer, member of boy band Shinee
Lee Jong-hyun, South Korean singer and actor, former member of rock band CNBLUE
Lee Jong-min (stage name Babylon), South Korean singer, member of boy band N-Train
Lee Jun-ho, South Korean singer and actor, member of boy band 2PM
Lee Jung-hwan (stage name Sandeul), South Korean singer, member of boy band B1A4
Lee Jung-shin, South Korean musician, member of rock band CNBLUE
Lee Min-hyuk, South Korean rapper, member of boy band BtoB
Mark Lee, Canadian singer, member of boy band NCT
Lee Min-woo, South Korean entertainer, member of boy band Shinhwa
Lee Seung-hyun (stage name Seungri), South Korean singer, former member of boy band Big Bang
Lee Seung-hoon (born 1992), South Korean rapper, member of boy band Winner
Lee Sun-ho (stage name Andy), South Korean singer, member of boy band Shinhwa
Lee Sung-min, South Korean singer, member of boy band Super Junior
Lee Sung-jong, South Korean singer, member of boy band Infinite
Lee Sung-yeol, South Korean singer, member of boy band Infinite
Lee Tae-il, South Korean singer, member of boy band Block B
Lee Tae-min, South Korean singer, member of boy band Shinee
Lee Tae-yong, South Korean rapper, member of boy band NCT

Members of girl groups
Lee Chae-rin (stage name CL), South Korean singer and rapper, former member of girl group 2NE1
Lee Chae-yeon, South Korean singer, former member of girl group Iz*One
Lee Da-bin (stage name Yeonwoo), South Korean singer and actress, former member of girl group Momoland
Lee Geu-roo (stage name Nancy), Korean-American singer, member of girl group Momoland
Lee Hye-ri, South Korean actress and singer, member of girl group Girl's Day
Lee Hyori, South Korean singer, member of girl group Fin.K.L
Lee Ji-yeon (stage name Lina), South Korean musical actress and singer, member of girl group The Grace
Lee Joo-won (stage name JooE), South Korean rapper, member of girl group Momoland
Lee Qri (born Lee Ji-hyun), South Korean singer and actress, member of girl group T-ara
Lee Luda, South Korean singer and actress, member of girl group Cosmic Girls
Lee Mi-joo, South Korean singer, member of girl group Lovelyz
Lee Min-young (stage name Min), South Korean singer, member of girl group Miss A
Lee Na-eun, South Korean singer and actress, member of girl group April
Lee Soon Kyu (stage name Sunny), Korean-American singer, member of girl group Girls' Generation
Lee Sunmi, South Korean singer, former member of girl group Wonder Girls
Lee Yeji (stage name Yezi), South Korean rapper, former member of girl group Fiestar

Musical performers
Lee Chae-yeon (singer, born 1978), South Korean singer
Lee Hae-ri, South Korean singer, member of pop ballad duo Davichi
Lee Ji-eun (stage name IU), South Korean singer
Lee Jung-hyun, South Korean singer and actress
JinJoo Lee, Korean-American musician, guitarist of pop rock band DNCE
Lee Mu-jin, South Korean singer
Lee Seung-chul, South Korean singer
Lee Seung-gi, South Korean singer
Lee Seung-hwan, South Korean singer
Lee Soo-young, South Korean ballad singer
Lee Sun-hee, South Korean singer
Lee Yejin (stage name Ailee), Korean-American singer

Sports

General
Lee Bum-ho, South Korean baseball player
Lee Bong-ju, South Korean marathoner
Lee Chang-ho, South Korean professional Go player
Lee Dae-ho, South Korean baseball player
Lee Eun-ju (gymnast), South Korean artistic gymnast
Lee Eun-Jung, South Korean long-distance runner 
Lee Hui-sol, South Korean Olympic weightlifter
Lee Hyung-taik, South Korean tennis player
Lee Jae-dong, South Korean professional StarCraft player
Sarah Lee (golfer), South Korean professional golfer
Meena Lee, South Korean professional golfer
Lee Mi-Ok, South Korean long-distance runner
Lee Sang-hyuk (better known as Faker), South Korean professional League of Legends player
Lee Sedol, South Korean professional Go player
Seon Hwa Lee, South Korean professional golfer
Lee Seung-Min, South Korean taekwondo coach
Lee Seung-Yeop, South Korean baseball player
Lee Sung-Hyun, South Korean kickboxer
Lee Sung-Jin, South Korean recursive archer
Lee Young-Ho (better known as Flash), South Korean professional StarCraft player
Lee Yun-yeol, South Korean entrepreneur, video game designer, and former professional gamer
Ri Yong-gum, North Korean skier

Badminton
Lee Dong-soo, South Korean badminton player
Lee Hyo-jung (badminton), South Korean badminton player
Lee Hyun-il, South Korean badminton player
Lee Joo-hyun, South Korean badminton player
Lee Kyung-won, South Korean badminton player
Lee Yong-dae, South Korean badminton player
Lee Young-suk, South Korean badminton player

Football (soccer)
Lee Bum-young, South Korean goalkeeper
Lee Chung-yong, South Korean footballer
Lee Chun-soo, South Korean footballer
Lee Dong-gook, South Korean footballer
Lee Eul-yong, South Korean football coach
Lee Jae-sung (footballer, born 1992), South Korean footballer
Lee Jung-soo, South Korean footballer
Lee Kang-in, South Korean footballer
Lee Keun-ho, South Korean footballer
Lee Seung-woo, South Korean footballer
Lee Woon-jae, South Korean goalkeeper
Lee Yong (footballer, born 1986), South Korean footballer
Lee Young-pyo, South Korean footballer

Taekwondo
Dae Sung Lee, Korean-American Taekwondo master
Rhee Chong Chul, South Korean Taekwondo master
Jhoon Rhee, South Korean Taekwondo master
Rhee Ki-ha, South Korean Taekwondo master

Volleyball
Lee Da-yeong, South Korean volleyball player 
Lee Jae-yeong, South Korean volleyball player 
Lee So-young (volleyball), South Korean volleyball player

See also
Lee (disambiguation)

Lee
Lee
Lee
Lee